The 7th Congress of the Workers' Party of Korea (WPK), the ruling party of North Korea, was held on 6–9 May 2016.

Background 
The 7th Congress was the first Congress of the Workers' Party of Korea held since the 6th Congress in 1980. In 2010 the party rules stipulation that Congresses be held every five years was dropped, recognising this had been ignored for thirty years.

The purpose of the Congress was to review the party's work from the time period since the 6th Congress, but also to instill public loyalty toward the leadership of the country.

On 30 October 2015, the Korean Central News Agency (KCNA) reported that the Political Bureau of the Central Committee of the Workers' Party of Korea announced a decision to hold a Congress in early May 2016, saying:

Preparations 
On 17 February 2016 joint slogans were issued by Workers' Party of Korea's Central Military Commission and Central Committee, and they were published by Rodong Sinmun and KCNA.

The Congress was preceded by a "70-day battle" mass mobilization campaign. Human Right Watch claims that the campaign meant uncompensated and forced labor for people across the country, including children, and that the object of the campaign was to boost outputs in manufacture and agriculture and demonstrate loyalty. A five-day holiday was declared for the duration of the Congress.

Congress 

The Congress was opened on 6 May 2016 at the April 25 House of Culture in Pyongyang, in the presence of 3,467 voting delegates. Unlike the last congress, there were no major foreign delegations,
but 128 foreign journalists from 12 countries were allowed to cover the event. Reporters were kept outside of the venue, and a recording of the opening event was only televised later in the evening.

The Congress opened with an address by Kim Jong-un. In it, he praised the country's January 2016 nuclear test and satellite launch. After having chosen its presidium and secretariat, the Congress approved its agenda:

Review of the work of the 6th Central Committee
Review of the work of the 6th Central Auditing Commission
Revision of the WPK Charter
Election of Kim Jong-un to the leadership of the WPK
Election of members to the central leadership organs of the WPK

The Congress continued on 7 May with Kim Jong-un's report on the work of the 6th Central Committee. In the report, Kim Jong-un reiterated the country's nuclear policy, calling it "a responsible nuclear weapons state". According to Kim, North Korea would not use nuclear weapons unless its sovereignty was violated. With regards to the economy, Kim announced the country's first Five-Year Plan since the 1980s. Speeches by other delegates expressed support for Kim's report.

A decision on approving Kim's report was unanimously adopted on 9 May. In it, the party vowed to continue building a more extensive nuclear arsenal. A report on the work of the Central Auditing Commission was then heard.

On the 9th, foreign journalists were briefly let in the Congress venue for the first time, during the announcement of Kim Jong-un's election as Chairman of the Workers' Party of Korea. The Congress ended on the 9th, and the day also saw a huge parade in Pyongyang in its honor.

Elections 

On May 9, Kim Jong-un was re-elected to the leadership of the party. His title in this capacity was changed from First Secretary to Chairman of the Workers' Party of Korea, a title reminiscent of that held by his grandfather before 1966: Chairman of the Central Committee of the Workers' Party of Korea.

15 members were elected to the 7th Central Auditing Commission: Choe Sung-ho, Pak Myong-sun, Kim Kyong-nam, Hwang Chol-sik, Kim Yong-chol, Ri Yong-ik, Kim Myong-hun, Kye Yong-sam, Jo Jong-ho, Kye Myong-chol, Jang Jong-ju, Pho Hui-song, Jong Pong-sok, Choe Kwon-su and Ho Kwang-uk. The Commission soon convened and chose as its Chairman Choe Sung-ho and Vice-Chairwoman Pak Myong-sun.

129 members and 106 alternate members were elected to the 7th Central Committee, including Kim Jong-un. It held its first plenum immediately after the Congress, on 10 May, and elected officials.

References

External links 

Photos from the opening day at Rodong Sinmun
Kim Jong-un's opening address at KCNA Watch
Text from Kim Jong Un's Report before the Congress at KCNA Watch
Documents from the 7th Workers' Party Congress at The National Committee on North Korea

Politics of North Korea
2016 in North Korea
2016 conferences
Congresses of the Workers' Party of Korea